Below is a list of Massachusetts state and regional high school football champions sanctioned by the Massachusetts Interscholastic Athletic Association since the organization began holding state championship games in 1972. From 1972 to 2012, only regional champions were crowned. Starting in 2013, a new format was implemented to crown a true state champion in six statewide divisions. The number of divisions expanded to eight in 2016, which has remained in place since.

Regional Champions

Eastern Massachusetts Champions

Central/Western Massachusetts Champions

State Champions

Most Championships

Vocational Champions
In addition, the Massachusetts Vocational Athletic Directors Association (MVADA) holds a tournament for vocational schools that do not qualify for the MIAA tournament. However, these championships are not recognized by the MIAA. The vocational champions are listed below:

See also
 List of Massachusetts state high school baseball champions

References

High school champions
Massachusetts champions
Massachusetts Interscholastic Athletic Association
High school football champions